Demisexuality is a sexual orientation in which an individual does not experience primary sexual attraction – the type of attraction that is based on immediately observable characteristics such as appearance or smell and is experienced immediately after a first encounter. A demisexual person can only experience secondary sexual attraction – the type of attraction that occurs after the development of an emotional bond. The amount of time that a demisexual individual needs to know another person before developing sexual attraction towards them varies from person to person. Demisexuality is generally categorized on the asexuality spectrum.

History

The term was coined in the Asexual Visibility and Education Network Forums in February 2006. Based on the theory that allosexuals experience both primary and secondary sexual attraction and asexuals do not experience either, the term demisexual was proposed for people who experience the latter without the former.

Demisexuality, as a component of the asexuality spectrum, is included in queer activist communities such as GLAAD and The Trevor Project. Demisexuality also has finer divisions within itself.

Post-doctorate research on demisexuality has been done since at least 2013, and podcasts and social media have also raised public awareness of demisexuality. 

The word gained entry to the Oxford English Dictionary in March 2022, with its earliest usage recorded in 2006 as a noun.

Since 2019, the app Tinder includes demisexual as an option for self-descriptors of one's sexual orientation on one's profiles.

Definition
A common general definition of demisexuality states that "demisexuality is a sexual orientation in which a person feels sexually attracted to someone only after they've developed a close/strong emotional bond with them".

This means demisexuals can experience sexual attraction that is formed from a bond they share with another person.

How much demisexuals need to know about a person before they feel sexually attracted to them varies from person to person. There is no specific timeline on how long it takes, either. There is also no way to determine what qualifies as a close or strong bond, which can cause confusion.

Demisexuals can enjoy a person's presence or be attracted to some of their qualities without having an interest in dating them or building a romantic relationship with them.

Primary vs. secondary sexual attraction model
Primary sexual attraction: sexual attraction towards people based on instantly available information (such as their appearance or smell). Primary sexual attraction is characterized as being experienced at first sight.
Secondary sexual attraction: sexual attraction towards people based on information that is not instantly available (such as personality, life experiences, talents, etc.); how much a person needs to know about the other and for how long they need to know about them before secondary sexual attraction develops varies from person to person.

After secondary sexual attraction is developed, demisexuals are not only aroused by personality traits. They also may or may not experience arousal or desire based on the physical traits of the persons they already experience secondary sexual attraction towards.

Common misconceptions and sexual activities

A common misconception is that demisexual individuals cannot engage in casual sex. It is important to note that being demisexual refers to how an individual experiences sexual attraction; it does not describe a choice or an action, but describes a feeling instead. While it is common for demisexuals to not desire sex without feeling sexually attracted to the other person, this is not required to be considered demisexual. Many demisexuals may choose to engage in casual sex even without experiencing sexual attraction towards their sexual partner.

Demisexuals do experience aesthetic attraction and can have an aesthetic preference. An aesthetic attraction is an attraction to another person's appearance that is not connected to any sexual or romantic desire; it is so called because of its similarity to other aesthetic desires. 

Demisexuals can be attracted to fictional characters. Demisexuals can also be attracted to a character played by an actor but experience no attraction towards the actor when out of character.

Attitudes towards sex
Demisexual, gray-asexual and asexual individuals (all included under the "ace umbrella") often use the terms favorable, neutral or indifferent, averse, or repulsed to describe how they feel about sex. Nonetheless, these terms can be used by anyone, regardless of if they are asexual spectrum or not.
Sex-repulsed: feeling repulsed or uncomfortable towards the thought of engaging in sex.
Sex-indifferent: no particular positive or negative feelings towards sex. Sex-indifferent individuals might partake in sex or avoid it.
Sex-favourable: sex-favourable individuals enjoy sex and may seek it out.
Sex-ambivalent: experiencing mixed or complicated feelings regarding the act or concept of sexual interaction, usually fluctuating between sex-neutral, sex-favorable or sex-positive and sex-repulsed, sex-negative or sex-averse.
These terms are generally used to refer to someone's opinion about engaging in sexual activities themself. However, they might also be used to describe how they feel reading, watching, hearing about, or imagining these activities. The term -repulsed in particular is often used to refer to one's feelings about engaging in sexual activities or being around them. One's feelings can vary depending on the situation or other factors such as identity, societal context, common social understanding or intent of actions, and/or comfort level with another individual. For example, someone who is aegosexual may enjoy thinking about sexual activities involving others but may feel repulsed upon the thought of personally participating in such activities.

In fiction
Demisexuality is a common theme (or trope) in romantic novels that has been termed "compulsory demisexuality". Within fictitious prose, the paradigm of sex being only truly pleasurable when the partners are in love is a trait commonly associated with female characters. The intimacy of the connection also allows for exclusivity to take place.

See also 

 Pansexuality 
 Asexuality

References

Human sexuality
Demisexuality